Prawat Nagvajara, born December 1, 1958, is a Thai academic and cross-country skier. He is the first person ever to have represented Thailand at the Winter Olympic Games, having taken part in the 2002 and 2006 Winter Olympics. Unsurprisingly, he was therefore his country's flagbearer at the Games' Opening Ceremonies on both occasions.

Nagvajara was born and grew up in Bangkok, Thailand, and was a member of a teenage rock band. He is currently a professor of electrical engineering at Drexel University in Pennsylvania, United States. Nagvajara has stated that Philip Boit was his inspiration to participate in the Olympics.

At the 2002 Games, Nagvajara took part in the 30 km race, but was eliminated after being lapped. He then competed in the 1.5 km sprint, and finished 68th out of 71 with a time of 4:14.55 - behind Cameroon's Isaac Menyoli and ahead of Costa Rica's Arturo Kinch.

At the 2006 Games, he competed in the 15 km classical race. He finished 97th, with a time of 1:07:15.9.

References

External links
 "Unlikely Olympian becomes unlikely hero", Badger Herald, February 21, 2002
 "Ski de fond : Prawat Nagvajara veut battre les Africains", Courier International
 "A few brave men", BBC, February 20, 2002
 "It's the taking part that counts", Duncan Mackay, The Guardian, February 8, 2002
 "Eleven on their own in Games", Associated Press, February 13, 2002

See also
Vanessa Vanakorn, the second ever Thai Winter Olympian, first woman, second skier, first female alpine skier
Kanes Sucharitakul, third ever Thai Winter Olympian, second man, third skier, first male alpine skier
Thailand at the 2002 Winter Olympics
Thailand at the 2006 Winter Olympics

1958 births
Living people
Prawat Nagvajara
Cross-country skiers at the 2002 Winter Olympics
Cross-country skiers at the 2006 Winter Olympics
Cross-country skiers at the 2003 Asian Winter Games
Prawat Nagvajara